The Redhill–Tonbridge line is a railway line in South East England that links Redhill, Surrey (on the Brighton Main Line) with Tonbridge, Kent (on the South Eastern Main Line).

History 
It was originally part of the South Eastern Railway, having been sanctioned by Act of Parliament in 1836 as part of the first railway line from London to Dover. This may explain why the route runs in a remarkably straight line: serving the settlements en route was a secondary consideration. Following the completion in 1868 of the new South Eastern Main Line, which provided a much more direct route between London and Tonbridge, the Redhill–Tonbridge line was used mainly for local services.

Aircraft landing at London's Croydon Airport in the early 20th century used this line to help with navigation. All the stations along this route had their names in bold white paint on the roof of the station buildings.

British Rail
In the British Rail era, there were through trains from Reading via Redhill (the North Downs Line) to Tonbridge, some of which carried Royal Mail traffic.

As part of the work to allow Eurostar services to reach London Waterloo International, the line was electrified with 750 V DC third rail in 1993, allowing Eurostar to use the line as a diversionary route. Consequently, some trains started to run through to London rather than to Reading.

Privatisation era
The service pattern on the line has changed several times since privatisation.

Initially, after privatisation, the stations on the line were managed by the South Eastern franchise holder.

This service pattern continued until 2008, when Southeastern withdrew its services from the line: the London Bridge–Tunbridge Wells services were transferred to Southern and curtailed at Tonbridge, and Southern took over management of all intermediate stations on the line. At the same time, Southern withdrew all services on the Horsham–Tunbridge Wells route, leaving only the London services (which ran hourly in the off-peak period and half-hourly at peak times).

Route

The railway line starts at Redhill station, where passenger connections are available for both the Brighton Main Line and the North Downs line.

After branching off the Brighton Main Line, the tracks immediately take a sharp curve eastwards (passing over the Quarry line, which is inside the Redhill tunnel); however, beyond that point the line runs in an almost perfectly straight line all the way to Tonbridge.

Continuing east, the line crosses over the East Grinstead branch of the Oxted line. Less than  later, the line then also crosses over the Uckfield branch of the Oxted line, where it bisects the Edenbridge Tunnel which the Uckfield line runs through; the two inner portals of the tunnel can be seen from a passing train. The route then reaches Edenbridge station  one of two railway stations serving the town of Edenbridge, alongside  on the Uckfield line.

After Edenbridge, the line reaches the only road level crossing en route; a  speed restriction is in place in the level crossing area. At Tonbridge, passenger connections are available for the South Eastern Main Line, the Hastings line and the Medway Valley line.

It is electrified using the third rail system and double-track throughout.

Services
All services on the line are operated by Southern using Class 377 Electrostar electric multiple units, with one train per hour shuttling between Redhill and Tonbridge (no through services at either end) seven days a week, increasing to two trains per hour at weekday peak periods. Services take just over 30 minutes end-to-end.

Accidents and incidents
On 21 January 1846, a bridge over the River Medway collapsed in a flood. The driver of a freight train was killed when he tried to jump clear of the train.
On 1 April 1852, a passenger train was derailed at Edenbridge.
On 22 December 2019, a landslip between Edenbridge and Godstone caused part of the line to be temporarily closed to traffic. A shuttle train service continued to operate between Tonbridge and Edenbridge, whilst the EdenbridgeRedhill section was served by replacement buses. The line reopened and normal services resumed in March 2020.

Gallery

Notes

References

External links
Steve's Railway pages – SER lines & stations
Southern Railway E-mail Group

Rail transport in Kent
Rail transport in Surrey
Railway lines in South East England
Standard gauge railways in England